Hyperloop UPV (a. k. a. Hyperloop Makers UPV) is a team of students from the Universitat Politècnica de València (Valencia, Spain) with the aim of designing Hyperloop, a proposed future means of transport. With renewable energies, the vehicle will levitate inside a vacuum tube, being able to reach .

The concept developed by Hyperloop UPV is distinguished by the use of magnetic levitation based on attraction to the top of the tube thanks to its levitation units located at the top of the pod, instead of air-bearing systems based on repulsion to a rail located at the bottom of the tube. Moreover, its aerodynamic design allows to a compensation of inertial forces that permit a higher radius of curvature, a lower cost for the air-evacuation and up to a 30% savings in infrastructure, with respect to other proposals. This revolutionary concept of Hyperloop is powered by detachable batteries and is propelled through compression and expansion of the air with a nozzle. A turbine recovers energy from the flow allowing a more efficient journey. With all these features it is pretended to reach velocities up to 1200 km/h, in a totally efficient manner, due to the use of renewable energies and prescinding from the use of fossil fuels.

The initial team in Design Weekend was composed of five students from the student community Makers UPV: Ángel Benedicto, Daniel Orient, David Pistoni, Germán Torres and Juan Vicén, together with advisor Vicente Dolz, assistant Professor at CMT- Motores Térmicos, Universitat Politècnica de València. They were awarded Top Design Concept and Propulsion/Compression Subsystem Technical Excellence Award at SpaceX's Design Weekend, the first phase of the Hyperloop Pod Competition 1 held in Texas in January 2016.

The team was expanded to more than 30 students in September 2016 in order to build a full-size prototype for SpaceX's Pod Competition, and in April 2017 the team was selected by SpaceX to participate in the Hyperloop Pod Competition 2, which was held in Los Angeles days 25–27 August 2017 in collaboration with Purdue University, becoming the world's first transatlantic student collaboration in the history of the development of the Hyperloop. They ranked amongst the best ten teams of the world in the Hyperloop Pod Competition 2. Nowadays, being a team of more than 40 people and with the support of many institutions and enterprises, the team is designing an improved prototype with the aim of winning the Hyperloop Pod Competition 3, scheduled in summer 2018.

History 
The project has its origins in August, 2015, when a team of five students of the Makers Community of the Polytechnical University of Valencia decided to take part in a competition organized by Elon Musk, the Hyperloop Design Weekend. This decision was taken as a result of a piece of news that one of them read, in which was said that with Hyperloop, airplanes would be useless for medium-range journeys (about 600 km) and all the universities worldwide were invited to participate in this competition in order to make Hyperloop a reality. 
The Hyperloop Makers UPV team was created in August 2015 when Daniel Orient, aerospace engineering student, read in a piece of news that with Hyperloop, airplanes would be useless for medium-range journeys (about 600 km). When he discovered that Elon Musk was organising a contest to make Hyperloop a reality and that it was open-source, he decided to ask for help to Makers UPV, a local community of makers from Valencia, Spain. That's when Ángel Benedicto, David Pistoni, Germán Torres and Juan Vicén decided to take part on the project and build together their own Hyperloop concept.

The team was selected to take part on the contest by SpaceX, and during this time until the competition was held, in January, 2016, these five UPV students worked very hard to write the "Hyperloop Makers UPV Technical Report", a scientific report that groups all the specifications and the design of its concept of Hyperloop. Once the competition arrived, thanks to the support given by the UPV, the team had the opportunity to travel to Texas and compete against the best universities of the world. Hyperloop UPV obtained Top Design Concept Award and Propulsion/Compression Subsystem Technical Excellence Award.
Time after the competition, the team gained international attention worldwide because they were the smallest team and they obtained the highest "awards-to-team size" ratio, with 2 awards for a team of 5 students plus their university advisor. All these leads to a huge media impact, appearing on Spanish TV and radio shows besides the talks they performed through the whole Peninsula.

A few months later, in September, 2016, after obtaining the support of many institutions and companies (ISTOBAL, Nagares S.A. a Spanish company focused on research, development, manufacturing and sales of electronic systems mainly for the automotive sector., Marca España.), the team grew until being more than 30 members, recruiting the most brilliant and motivated students of the Polytechnic University of Valencia.

During the time passed until the next competition, this new and expanded team worked on the design and construction of the prototype that will compete in the USA next summer, in the Hyperloop Pod Competition 2. Furthermore, Hyperloop UPV started a collaboration with the Purdue University (Indiana, USA), and thanks to the help given by all the companies that decided to trust in the great potential of these students, they build the Atlantic II, a prototype resulting from the world's first transatlantic student collaboration in the history of the development of the Hyperloop. The team got to be amongst the best 10 teams of the world with one of the most complete prototypes.

After the competition, the team expanded until being 35 members that will work hand in hand in order to make the concept of Hyperloop a reality.

In October, 2017 the team got the necessary support in order to install the Hyper-Track, a vacuum tube similar to the one used in SpaceX. Being one of the first in Europe, the Hyper-Track allows to carry out all the necessary tests to develop the technologies used in the new design of the prototype.

Nowadays, Hyperloop UPV works everyday in order to design a new improved prototype with the aim of presenting it in the next competition, scheduled in August, 2018.

Team
Nowadays, Hyperloop UPV team is formed by 35 members plus advisors. The team has a horizontal organization it is led by a project manager, that is responsible for the management all the sub-teams, being a total of six, each led by its respective manager. These sub-teams are: Propulsion, Structures, Avionics, Energy, Partners & Economics and Creative. All of them work together in order to make Hyperloop a reality.

References

Hyperloop
Maglev
Emerging technologies